Hurricane Gerda was a North Atlantic tropical cyclone that formed during the 1969 Atlantic hurricane season. It was the seventh named storm, fifth hurricane and third major hurricane of the 1969 season. Gerda formed on September 6 and crossed Florida as a tropical depression. Gerda later became a tropical storm after making a hard right turn and moving northeast and reaching hurricane status on September 8. On September 10, Gerda made landfall near Eastport, Maine, and became extratropical the following day.

Hurricane Gerda brought light rain across southern Florida and moderate to heavy rain across eastern North Carolina and New England, causing minor damage to trees and powerlines. There were no fatalities or injuries from Gerda although planes at Otis Air Force Base were moved to their hangars and two ships from Naval Station Newport left their berth to ride out the storm.

Meteorological history

A tropical wave moved off the western coast of Africa on August 21 and moved westward across the Atlantic Ocean without development. On September 3, the disturbance merged with a dissipating upper-level low pressure system over Hispaniola and Puerto Rico and developed an increasing cloud mass as it continued westward. As the disturbance crossed the Bahamas, satellite imagery showed the disturbance gaining a distinct circulation on September 5. On September 6, the disturbance became a Tropical Depression before it made landfall in southeastern Florida on the same day.

After crossing Florida, the depression drifted northeastward back over the western Atlantic Ocean on September 7. Forecasters at the National Hurricane Center upgraded the system to tropical storm status and named it Gerda. Gerda continued to move rapidly northeast in response to an approaching trough and the storm reached hurricane status on September 8. Because the storm was interacting with the trough to the west and was moving rapidly northeastward, the result was the minimum central barometric pressure was an unusually high . Gerda later made landfall near Eastport, Maine later that day as a Category 1 hurricane, one of the strongest to ever make landfall in the state. Gerda then became extratropical as it crossed into Canada as an  extratropical storm on September 10. The storm later dissipated the following day.

Preparations

Gale warnings and small craft advisories were issued along the coast of North Carolina stretching from Wilmington to Cape Hatteras.
Storm shelters in Kitty Hawk and Manteo, North Carolina were opened and the American Red Cross sent relief workers and equipment to North Carolina. In Frederick County, Maryland, local forecasters and the National Weather Service issued a flood watch while the National Hurricane Center issued a hurricane watch for the county, as well as the rest of eastern Maryland.  Officials at the National Weather Service and National Hurricane Center predicted that the western half of the storm would lash New York City and much of New England (which were under a hurricane watch) with high winds and torrential rainfall.

Ships and other water craft were advised to avoid the Cape Cod area as the storm was forecast to brush that area, which was put under a hurricane warning by the National Hurricane Center. In Massachusetts, schools were closed and emergency shelters were opened to accommodate evacuees. Evacuations were ordered for residents living in low-lying areas in Cape Cod. In Boston, the threat of the storm caused both elementary and middle schools to close at noon while high schools were closed at 1 p.m. (est). The approach of the storm also postponed a fair at a local hospital and planes at Otis Air Force Base were quickly moved to their hangars. Much of southeastern Massachusetts civil defense and fire departments were alerted in preparation of the storm's impact. In Rhode Island, schools and other buildings were used as shelter to house evacuees. As Hurricane Gerda sped up the East Coast of the United States, the National Hurricane Center extended the hurricane warnings from Block Island, Rhode Island to Eastport, Maine. At Naval Station Newport in Newport, Rhode Island, two ships of the United States Navy left their berths to ride out the storm. One of which was the Comcrudeslant flagship USS Puget Sound (AD-38).

Impact
Hurricane Gerda affected much of eastern North Carolina and New England with gusty rain and heavy rainfall causing minor to moderate damage. In Florida, Gerda dropped light rainfall across southern and central portions of the state. Damage there, if any, was unknown. In Canada, Gerda passed over Labrador as a strong extratropical storm with hurricane-force winds. Damage there is unknown.

In North Carolina, Gerda produced moderate rainfall across the Outer Banks. Gerda then dropped heavy rainfall across eastern Virginia, Maryland, New Jersey and New York. There was no reported damage from Gerda's impact on North Carolina and the Mid-Atlantic States.

Gerda produced heavy rainfall throughout much of southeastern New England. The heavy rainfall caused isolated street flooding due to clogged storm drains. Elsewhere in New England, the storm caused minor damage to trees, powerlines and highways. There were no reported fatalities or injuries from Gerda's impact on New England.

See also

List of New England hurricanes

References

Gerda
Gerda (1969)
1969 natural disasters in the United States
1969 in Canada